This article lists every season of Fulham Football Club from their first professional season in the Southern Football League Division 2, up to the present day. It details the club's achievements in major competitions and the top scorers in the league for each season. The table is correct up to the 2021–22 season.

Seasons

Key

Pld – Matches played
W – Matches won
D – Matches drawn
L – Matches lost
GF – Goals for
GA – Goals against
Pts – Points
Pos – Final position

Prem – Premier League
Champ – EFL Championship
Div 1 – Football League First Division
Div 2 – Football League Second Division
Div 3 – Football League Third Division
Div 3S – Football League Third Division South
SL Div 1 – Southern League Division One
SL Div 2 – Southern League Division Two
SL Div 2L – Southern League Division Two (London section)
LL Prem – London League Premier Division
LL Div 1– London League Division One
WL Div 1 – Western League Division One
WL Div 1A – Western League Division One Section A
n/a – Not applicable

5Q – Fifth qualifying round
PR – Preliminary round
GS – Group stage
R1 – First round
R2 – Second round
R3 – Third round
R4 – Fourth round
R5 – Fifth round
QF – Quarter-finals
SF – Semi-finals
RU – Runners-up
W – Winners
(S) – Southern section of regionalised stage

Notes

References

Seasons
Seasons
 
Fulham